Béla Barsy, also credited as Barsi (24 January 1906 - 30 April 1968) was a Hungarian actor. He appeared in more than sixty films from 1952 to 1968.

Selected filmography

References

External links 

1906 births
1968 deaths
Hungarian male film actors